The Mining Institute of Cornwall was founded in 1876 in Camborne, Cornwall, UK.

The Institute held monthly meetings where papers were read and discussed, and held annual exhibitions of mining machinery and tools.

References

1876 establishments in England
Cornish mining organisations
Organisations based in Cornwall